Foreign Exchange Student may refer to:

Student exchange program
An episode of the TV-show My Name Is Earl